4-Dimethylaminophenol (DMAP) is an aromatic compound containing both phenol and amine functional groups. It has the molecular formula C8H11NO.

Uses
4-Dimethylaminophenol has been used as an antidote for cyanide poisoning. It has also been shown to be effective in treating hydrogen sulfide toxicity.

It works by generating methemoglobin.

This is suitable as an emergency treatment only; treatment must be followed up with sodium thiosulfate or cobalamin.

In an animal model, it has shown effectiveness when given intramuscularly. Though, intramuscular injection should be avoid due to the probability of muscular necrosis after injection. Intravenous injection is recommended in a dose of 250 mg.

See also
Metol

References

Antidotes
Anilines
Phenols